Newbottle is a civil parish and largely deserted village in West Northamptonshire, about  west of the market town of Brackley.

The village's name means 'new building'.

A stream that is a tributary of the River Cherwell forms the parish boundary to the north-west. The remainder of the parish boundary mostly follows field boundaries.

The 2001 census recorded a parish population of 438, most of whom live in Charlton. increasing to a joint population of 528 at the 2011 census,

Archaeology
Rainsborough Camp is an early Iron Age hill fort in the southernmost part of the parish. Excavations in 1961–65 found that it had been inhabited and developed in phases between the 4th century BC and about 4 AD.

Manor
Newbottle manor house is 16th century, built probably in the reign of Henry VIII possibly by Peter Dormer, a member of the famous Buckinghamshire family, who held "Nubottel" at about that time when his daughter Elizabeth married the owner of Salford Hall, Salford Abbots. The west wing was added in the 17th century and the library has panelling dating from about 1730. The house has also an octagonal dovecote.

Parish church
The Church of England parish church of Saint James has a tower built in about 1290-1210 and a Norman font. The present chancel is 13th century. Between the nave and north aisle is a four-bay Decorated Gothic arcade. The south aisle is a Perpendicular Gothic arcade addition. The Gothic Revival east window in the chancel was inserted in 1865 and its stained glass is by C.E. Kempe.

In the Middle Ages St. James' belonged to the Augustinian Dunstable Priory. The Priory's annals for 1291, record it as receiving tithes from Newbottle. It still possessed St. James' in 1535 when the Crown's bailiff valued the Priory's property and estates in preparation for the Dissolution of the Monasteries.

St. James' now forms a single benefice with SS Peter and Paul, King's Sutton.

References

Further reading

External links

Villages in Northamptonshire
Civil parishes in Northamptonshire
West Northamptonshire District